The 1890 Virginia Orange and Blue football team represented the University of Virginia as an independent the 1890 college football season. The team had no known coach, and went 5–2 and claims a Southern championship. The  115–0 drubbing by Princeton  signaled football's arrival in the south.

Schedule

References

Virginia
Virginia Cavaliers football seasons
Virginia Orange and Blue football